Svein-Erik Hamran (born 1960) is a Norwegian professor in radar remote sensing at the University of Oslo. He led the development of the Radar Imager for Mars' subsurface experiment (RIMFAX) for the Mars rover Perservance as Principal Investigator for the Norwegian Defence Research Establishment (FFI), and is a Co-Principal Investigator for the WISDOM radar on the European Space Agency Rosalind Franklin rover.

Hamran is the head of the University of Oslo's Centre for Space Sensors and Systems (CENSSS) at Kjeller.

References

External links 

 University of Oslo profile page

Norwegian University of Science and Technology alumni
Living people
Mars 2020
Norwegian physicists
1960 births
Academic staff of the University of Oslo
University of Tromsø alumni